Gerdakaneh-ye Sofla (also Romanized as Gerdakāneh-ye Soflá; also known as Gerda Kāneh-ye Pā’īn, Gerdeh Kāneh-ye Soflá, Gerdeh Kānī-ye Pā’īn, Gerdkānī-ye Pā’īn, Gerdkānī-ye Soflá, and Gīrdehkanī Pāīn) is a village in Gavrud Rural District, in the Central District of Sonqor County, Kermanshah Province, Iran. At the 2006 census, its population was 435, in 97 families.

References 

Populated places in Sonqor County